Mischievous Children  or Bola or Ozornik is an Uzbek adventure film from 1977.

Damir Salimov was the film's director and the script was written by Shukhrat Abbasov and Alexander Naumov.  The film became one of the most popular, favored by Uzbek and foreign film critics.  The plot revolves around an irrepressible nurse who leads an eleven-year-old Bola (the original name of the character Qoravoy) played by Abduraim Abduvahobov on adventures. It also starred Yoqub Ahmedov.

References

1970s adventure films
1977 films
Uzbek-language films
Uzbekistani adventure films
Soviet-era Uzbek films